Göran Crafoord (born 27 March 1939) is a Swedish former sailor who competed in the 1960 Summer Olympics.

References

1939 births
Living people
Swedish male sailors (sport)
Olympic sailors of Sweden
Sailors at the 1960 Summer Olympics – Dragon
Place of birth missing (living people)